Liga Deportiva Universitaria de Quito is a football club based in Quito, Ecuador that competes in the Serie A, the senior football league in Ecuador. Since its official founding in 1930, the club has had 40 presidents, 10 of whom have served multiple stints. The current president is Guillermo Romero. The Honorary President is Rodrigo Paz, who has served as president on three non-consecutive occasions and has served as the director of the club's football commission.

List of presidents

References

External links

Presidents